Euphaea formosa is a species of damselfly in the family Euphaeidae, found primarily in Taiwan.

The IUCN conservation status of Euphaea formosa is "LC", least concern, with no immediate threat to the species' survival.

References

External links

 

Euphaeidae
Insects described in 1869